Sepik Iwam, or Yawenian, is a language of Papua New Guinea. It is the lexical basis of the Hauna trade pidgin.

It is spoken in villages such as Iniok in Tunap/Hunstein Rural LLG of East Sepik Province.

Phonology

Pronouns
Sepik Iwam pronouns:

{| 
!colspan=2|  !! singular !! dual !! plural
|-
!colspan=2| 1st person
| ka || kərar || kəram
|-
!colspan=2| 2nd person
| kə || kow || kom
|-
!rowspan=2| 3rd person
! masculine
| si
| rowspan="2" | sow 
| rowspan="2" | səm
|-
! feminine
| sa
|}

Grammar
Sepik Iwam subject agreement suffixes are:

{| class="wikitable"
!  !! singular !! dual !! plural
|-
! masculine
| *-ən
| rowspan="2" | *-o
| rowspan="2" | *-əm
|-
! feminine
| *-a
|}

The structure of this subject agreement paradigm can be traced back to Proto-Sepik, although the morphemes themselves do not seem to be directly related to the reconstructed Proto-Sepik forms. (See also Sepik languages#Gender.)

References

Further reading
 

Iwam languages
Languages of East Sepik Province